Igelfors Bruk AB is a Swedish manufacturer of different forgings, including transmission details for trucks and drawbars for circuit breakers. They also manufacture customer-ready products, including Rescue Axes that are shipped worldwide. The company is a subsidiary owned by the Permec Group, and is situated in a small village called Igelfors, hence the company name. It was founded in 1891, when two local factories, Igelfors Stångjärnsbruk and Nyhammars spikbruk, were merged.

References
Company Website
Permec Group
Industrial History Retrieved 2009-09-04.

Companies based in Östergötland County
Manufacturing companies of Sweden
1891 establishments in Sweden